

Horst von Mellenthin (31 July 1898 – 8 January 1977) was a German general during World War II who commanded several corps. He was a recipient of the Knight's Cross of the Iron Cross with Oak Leaves of Nazi Germany. Mellenthin surrendered to the Americans at the end of war, and was interned until 1948. After his release, he joined the Gehlen Organization.

Awards and decorations
 Iron Cross (1914) 2nd Class (22 August 1915) & 1st Class (29 May 1917)
 Clasp to the Iron Cross (1939) 2nd Class (15 July 1943) & 1st Class (26 July 1943)
 German Cross in Gold on 25 March 1944 as Generalmajor and commander of the 205. Infanterie-Division
 Knight's Cross of the Iron Cross with Oak Leaves
 Knight's Cross on 10 October 1944 as Generalleutnant and commander of the 205. Infanterie-Division
 Oak Leaves on 4 April 1945 as Generalleutnant and commander of the 205. Infanterie-Division

References

Citations

Bibliography

 
 
 

1898 births
1977 deaths
Generals of Artillery (Wehrmacht)
German Army personnel of World War I
Recipients of the clasp to the Iron Cross, 1st class
Recipients of the Gold German Cross
Recipients of the Knight's Cross of the Iron Cross with Oak Leaves
Military personnel from Hanover
People from the Province of Hanover
People of the Federal Intelligence Service
Commanders Crosses of the Order of Merit of the Federal Republic of Germany
Reichswehr personnel
German prisoners of war in World War II held by the United States